The 1940 United States Senate election in Florida was held on November 5, 1940. 

Incumbent Senator Charles O. Andrews failed to achieve a majority in the May 7 primary election, but defeated Jerry W. Carter easily in a run-off on May 28. Andrews won the November general election without an opponent.

Background
Incumbent Senator Andrews was first elected in a special 1936 election to complete the unexpired term of Park Trammell.

Democratic primary

Candidates
 Charles O. Andrews, incumbent Senator
 Jerry W. Carter, member of the Florida Railway Commission and candidate for Governor in 1936
 Charles Francis Coe, resident of West Palm Beach
 Fred P. Cone, Governor of Florida
 O. B. Hazen, resident of Pahokee
 Bernarr Macfadden, retired bodybuilder and proponent of physical culture

Results

Runoff

General election

Results

See also 
 1940 United States Senate elections

References 

1940
Florida
United States Senate
Single-candidate elections